Colombia Federation of Skating Sports (Spanish: Federación Colombiana de Patinaje) is the sports governing body of bandy, figure skating, ice hockey, speed skating and short track in Colombia. The federation is a member of the Federation of International Bandy, the International Skating Union and the International Ice Hockey Federation.

Sources

External links
 

Federation of International Bandy members
Ice hockey governing bodies in South America
National governing bodies for ice skating
Skating
Organizations with year of establishment missing